The swimming competitions at the 2000 Summer Olympics in Sydney took place from 16 to 23 September 2000 at the Sydney International Aquatic Centre in Homebush Bay. It featured 32 events (16 male, 16 female), and a total of 954 swimmers from 150 nations.

The swimming program for 2000 was expanded from 1996, with the inclusion of the semifinal phase in each of the events except for some special cases. Long-distance swimming events (400 m freestyle, 800 m freestyle, 1500 m freestyle, and 400 m individual medley) and all relays still maintained the old format with only two phases: heats and final. Because of the radical changes in the competition format, it was extended into an eight-day program and thereby continued into the present era.

Swimmers from the United States were the most successful, winning 14 golds, 8 silver, and 11 bronze to lead the overall medal count with 33. Meanwhile, Australia had produced a total of 18 medals (five golds, nine silver, and four bronze) to claim the second spot in the tally. A total of fourteen world records and thirty-eight Olympic records were set during the competition.

Events
The following events were contested (all pool events were long course, and distances are in metres unless stated):
Freestyle : 50, 100, 200, 400, 800 (women) and 1500 (men);
Backstroke : 100 and 200;
Breaststroke : 100 and 200;
Butterfly : 100 and 200;
Individual medley : 200 and 400; 
Relays: 4 × 100 free, 4 × 200 free, and 4 × 100 medley.

Schedule

Participating nations
A total of 954 swimmers (558 men and 336 women) from 150 nations would compete in swimming events at these Olympic Games. Aruba, Côte d'Ivoire, Dominican Republic, Equatorial Guinea, Georgia, Guinea, Iraq, Laos, Mali, Federated States of Micronesia, Mongolia, Niger, Qatar, Rwanda, Saint Vincent and the Grenadines, Sudan, and Tajikistan made their official debut in swimming. The full list of participating NOCs is the following:

Medal summary

Results

Men's events

* Swimmers who participated in the heats only and received medals.

Women's events

* Swimmers who participated in the heats only and received medals.

References

External links
Official Olympic Report
Results
2000 Sydney Olympics Coverage – ABC News Australia

 
2000 Summer Olympics events
2000
O
Swimming competitions in Australia